The Men's 1991 European Amateur Boxing Championships were held in Gothenburg, Sweden from May 7 to 12. The 29th edition of the bi-annual competition, in which 191 fighters from 26 countries participated this time, was organised by the European governing body for amateur boxing, EABA.

Medal winners

MEDAL TABLE

External links
Results
EABA Boxing

E
Boxing
European Amateur Boxing Championships
B
International sports competitions in Gothenburg
EBA Championships
1990s in Gothenburg